The following is the list of cities in Turkmenistan that underwent one or more name changes in the past. Years in parentheses indicate the year a name was changed. A question mark (?) indicates the date of name change is needed.

Amul → Charjuy (?) → Leninsk (1924) → Charjuy = Charjou = Çärjew (1927) → Turkmenabat (1999)
Askhabad → Poltoratsk (1919) → Ashgabat (1927)
Bäherden → Baharly (2003) → Bäherden (2018)
Bekdaş → Garabogaz (2002)
Çarşaňňy → Köýtendag (1999)
Çeleken → Hazar
Çetili → Sakarçäge (?)
Dargan-Ata → Birata (?) → Darganata (2017)
Gazanjyk = Kazandzhik (1895) → Bereket (1999)
Gowurdak → Magdanly (?)
Gyzyl-arbat = Kizil-arvat → Serdar (1999) → Gyzylarbat (2022)
Kalinin → Boldumsaz (1993)
Ganlygala → Aleksandrov (~1890) → Kara Kala = Garrygala (~1924) → Magtymguly (2004)
Kerki → Atamyrat (1999) → Kerki (2017)
Kirovsk → Babadaýhan (1992)
Shagadam → Kyzyl-Su → Krasnovodsk (1869) → Turkmenbashy (1993)
Kushka = Guşgy (1885) → Serhetabat (1999)
Neftedag (1933) → Nebit-dag (1946) → Balkanabat (2001)
Neftezavodsk (1973) → Seýdi (1990)
Okyabrsk → Saparmyrat Türkmenbaşy adyndaky (1993)
Şehitli → Şatlyk (1971)
Stalino (1940?) → Moskovskiy (1961) → Murgap (?)
Täzä Bazar → imeni Andreyeva (1938) → Andreyevsk (194?) → Täzebazar (1957) → Nyýazow (1993) → Şabat (2022)
Täzä-Gala → imeni Telmana (1938) → Telmansk (1949) → Gubadag (1993)
Tejen State Farm → Bereket (~1993) → Altyn Asyr (2000)
Yuzhnyy → Dostluk (?)
Ýylanly → Gurbansoltan Eje (2004) → Andalyp (2022)

References

See also
List of cities in Turkmenistan
List of cities, towns and villages in Turkmenistan
List of renamed cities in Kazakhstan
List of renamed cities in Kyrgyzstan
List of renamed cities in Tajikistan
List of renamed cities in Uzbekistan

Turkmenistan geography-related lists
Populated places in Turkmenistan
Renamed, Turkmenistan
Turkmenistan, Renamed
Turkmenistan